The 2021–22 season is Galatasaray's 67th season in the existence of the club. The team plays in the Women's Basketball Super League and in the EuroLeague Women.

Sponsorship and kit manufacturers

Supplier: Galatasaray Store
Main sponsor: Nef 
Back sponsor: —

Sleeve sponsor: —
Short sponsor: Mixmey 
Socks sponsor: —

Team

Players

Depth chart

Squad changes

In

|}

Out

|}

Coach

On loan

Staff and management

Competitions

Overview

Women's Basketball Super League

League table

Results summary

Results by round

Matches

Note: All times are TRT (UTC+3) as listed by the Turkish Basketball Federation.

Playoffs

Quarterfinals

Note: All times are TRT (UTC+3) as listed by the Turkish Basketball Federation.

EuroLeague Women

Regular season (Group B)

Results summary

Results by round

Matches

Note: All times are CET (UTC+1) as listed by EuroLeague.

EuroCup Women

Quarterfinals

Note: All times are CET (UTC+1) as listed by EuroCup.

EuroCup Women Final Four

Semifinals

Note: All times are CET (UTC+1) as listed by EuroCup.

Third place game

Note: All times are CET (UTC+1) as listed by EuroCup.

Turkish Women's Basketball Cup

Quarterfinals

References

Galatasaray
Galatasaray S.K. (women's basketball) seasons
Galatasaray Sports Club 2021–22 season